General David (de) Montolieu, Baron de St Hippolyte (16699 June 1761) was a French Huguenot officer in the British service. He came to England as refugee with William, Prince of Orange in 1688, and entered the army. For his services in Piedmont against France, Montolieu de Saint-Hippolyte was created a Baron of the Holy Roman Empire (Reichsfreiherr) by Emperor Joseph I, by letters patent dated at Vienna, 14 February 1706.

His male issue became extinct on the death s.p.m.s. of his grandson Louis Montolieu, seigneur de Saint-Hippolyte, 3rd Baron, 20 May 1817. The heir of the line of the Barons de St Hippolyte was in 1910 his great-granddaughter Constance Maria, née Hammersley, widow of Lieut.-Colonel Henry Edward Stopford (though Lord Elibank was often erroneously stated to be the heir).

References

External links
Agnew, David Carnegie Andrew (1871), 
Ruvigny, Marquis de (1910), The Nobilities of Europe, p. 350

This article incorporates text from publications now in the public domain:

1669 births
1761 deaths
17th-century soldiers
18th-century soldiers
Barons of the Holy Roman Empire
British military personnel of the War of the Spanish Succession
Year of birth uncertain